The 78th World Science Fiction Convention (Worldcon), also known as CoNZealand, was held on 29 July–2 August 2020. It was planned to be held at the TSB Arena and Shed 6, Intercontinental Hotel, Michael Fowler Center, in Wellington, New Zealand. However, due to the COVID-19 pandemic, the organizers announced in March 2020 that it would be held as a virtual convention, with no on-site attendance.

Participants

Guests of Honour 

 Mercedes Lackey and Larry Dixon
 Greg Broadmore
 Rose Mitchell
 George R. R. Martin (toastmaster)

Awards

2020 Hugo Awards 

The winners were:

 Best Novel: A Memory Called Empire, by Arkady Martine
 Best Novella: This Is How You Lose the Time War, by Amal El-Mohtar and Max Gladstone
 Best Novelette: "Emergency Skin", by N. K. Jemisin
 Best Short Story: "As the Last I May Know", by S. L. Huang
 Best Series: The Expanse, by James S. A. Corey
 Best Related Work: "2019 John W. Campbell Award Acceptance Speech", by Jeannette Ng
 Best Graphic Story: LaGuardia, written by Nnedi Okorafor, art by Tana Ford, colours by James Devlin
 Best Dramatic Presentation, Long Form: Good Omens, written by Neil Gaiman, directed by Douglas Mackinnon
 Best Dramatic Presentation, Short Form: The Good Place: "The Answer", written by Daniel Schofield, directed by Valeria Migliassi Collins
 Best Professional Editor, Long Form: Navah Wolfe
 Best Professional Editor, Short Form: Ellen Datlow
 Best Professional Artist: John Picacio
 Best Semiprozine: Uncanny Magazine
 Best Fanzine: The Book Smugglers
 Best Fancast: Our Opinions Are Correct, presented by Annalee Newitz and Charlie Jane Anders
 Best Fan Writer: Bogi Takács
 Best Fan Artist: Elise Matthesen

Other awards 

The winners were:

 Lodestar Award for Best Young Adult Book: Catfishing on CatNet, by Naomi Kritzer
 Astounding Award for Best New Writer: R. F. Kuang

Site selection 

New Zealand in 2020 was the only bid which officially filed to host the 78th World Science Fiction Convention, and its selection was confirmed by vote of the members of the 76th World Science Fiction Convention in San José.

After the vote, the bid announced the name of their convention was CoNZealand, and that it was to be held on 29 July–2 August 2020, in Wellington, New Zealand. The announcement was accompanied by a reveal video announcing the Guests of Honour, and a short message from Jacinda Ardern, the Prime Minister of New Zealand.

See also 

 Hugo Award
 Science fiction
 Speculative fiction
 World Science Fiction Society
 Worldcon

References

External links 

 
 List of current Worldcon bids
 CoNZealand Website

2020 conferences
Worldcon